Vanessa Fox (born 1972) is a search engine optimization consultant, blogger and author. She worked on Google's Webmaster Central, a set of tools and educational materials assisting webmasters on how to have their sites listed in Google and in understanding how Google indexes their pages. and a speaker at industry events. She is from California.

Fox joined Google in 2005 as a technical writer in its Kirkland, Washington office. She left Google in June 2007, and briefly worked for real-estate startup Zillow. She is an entrepreneur-in-residence with Ignition Partners and she is one of the 16 members of the University of Washington's MSIM/Informatics advisory board.

Fox founded Nine By Blue, a marketing consultancy with an emphasis on search. Fox worked at a Seattle web startup and AOL before joining Google in 2005. While at Google, she was based at Google's Kirkland, Washington office.

Vanessa is currently the CEO of Keylime Toolbox

Authorship

Fox's book, Marketing in the Age of Google, published in May 2010 by Wiley  (second edition published in May 2012), is about marketing with search engines. She is one of the authors for offline and online publications, such as O'Reilly Radar and Search Engine Land. She also writes about holistic marketing strategies that integrate searcher behavior and search-friendly best practices for developers at Nine By Blue.

References

External links

 Vanessa Fox personal blog

1972 births
Living people
Search engine optimization consultants
American bloggers